The Honourable Society of Knights of the Round Table, also known as The Knights of the Round Table Club, is a British society which exists to perpetuate the name and fame of King Arthur and the ideals for which he stood. It meets at the Lansdowne Club, Mayfair.

History
The society was formed in 1720 at the Fountain Coffee House, the site of the former Savoy Palace on London's Strand. Its membership was drawn from authors, actors, artists, and their patrons.  Famous members included David Garrick, who was a member from 1761 to 1776, and Charles Dickens.

Statutes of the Society
As set out in a booklet of 1946:
 1. The objects of this Loyal and Ancient Club may be described briefly as :
(a) The perpetuation of the Name and Fame of Arthur,
King of Britain, and the Ideals for which he stood.
(b) The promotion of Knightly good-fellowship.
(c) The cultivation of better International understanding,
based on practical lines.
N.B. To ensure that the object at (a) is carried out in the
true spirit, a Knight, well versed in the history of the immortal King Arthur, shall be charged with the duty of
proposing the Toast of " King Arthur," and of recounting
the exploits and good works of that Monarch, at every
meeting of The Knights of the Round Table. This Toast
shall follow immediately after the Toasts of the Reigning
Sovereign and the Members of His Royal House. The
Knight responsible for it will be known as " King Arthur's
Champion," and so described in all records.
 2. The Club shall have an Advisory Council consisting of the following ex officio members :
The Knight President ;
The Deputy Knights President ;
Senior Knight Vice-President ;
Knights Vice-president ;
and all Knights Councillor who held that title on the 1st May,
1946.
An additional number, not exceeding ten, may be elected
from time to time. The election of these additional Councillors
shall be for a term of three years, such term to date as from the
1st January following such appointment.
Retiring members shall be eligible for re-election. Election
to the Council shall be either in recognition of work done for or
on behalf of the Club and its ideals or to provide representatives
of the younger Knights with an opportunity to express their
opinions, and to qualify them to take an active part in the administration of the Club as members of the Executive Committee.
The Council shall be responsible for the election of new
members and for the re-election of retiring members of the
Council. When doing so they shall give careful consideration to
any recommendations by individual Knights, who must send
such recommendations in writing to the Knight Remembrancer.
Except for the election of Knights to the Advisory Council,
that body will have no executive duties but shall be consulted
by the Executive Committee on such matters as the appointment
of a new Knight President, suggestions for alteration of the
Statutes, and on any other matter affecting the welfare of the
Club on which the Executive Committee desire their guidance.
A Meeting of the Advisory Council shall be held during the
four weeks preceding the Annual General Meeting. Nine shall
form a quorum.
The Administration and Organisation of the Club shall be
in the hands of an Executive Committee consisting of the following
members ex officio :
Knight President ;
Deputy Knights President ;
Senior Knight Vice-Prcsident ;
Knight Remembrancer ;
Knight Treasurer ;
together with five Knight Councillors selected by the above
ex officio members.
Elections shall be for a term of three years, dating from 1st
January next following such appointments. Retiring members
shall be eligible for re-election. Three shall form a quorum.
Any matter not dealt with by the Statutes shall be decided
by the Executive Committee.
 3. The number of Knights shall be limited to two hundred, exclusive of those admitted to the Honorary List for special reasons, and their election in all cases shall be determined by the Executive Committee.
 4. Each Candidate for admission to the Active List of the Knightly Circle must be proposed in writing to the Executive Committee by two Knights, who, from their personal knowledge of him, can vouch for his fitness, in every respect, for admission. His full name and profession must be stated. Such candidates must be British, or Overseas, subjects of the Crown.
 5. The election of a candidate shall not be deemed to be complete until he shall have made a Declaration of Loyalty to the Sovereign, and of fealty to the Knight President, in the form prescribed at page 36 of the Knights Manual. This Declaration will be made by him publicly at the first meeting of the Knights which he attends after his candidature has been approved by the Executive Committee. The Knightly Oath of Honorary Knights not being British subjects shall not be required on such occasions as the Knight President considers advisable. In the event of the failure of the Candidate to comply with this requirement, his nomination as a Knight of the Round Table will be cancelled.
 6. An Annual Subscription of Two Guineas shall be due on the FIRST DAY OF JANUARY in each year. Newly elected Knights arc required to pay an Entrance Fee of Three Guineas and their Annual Subscription of Two Guineas within a month of election. Every Knight who shall fail to pay within a month shall have due notice thereof, and if he remain in default a further period of twenty-one days from such notice he shall cease, ipso facto, to be a Knight. Should he wish, at any future time, to rejoin the Club, he must be proposed and seconded and his name submitted to the Executive Committee in the usual manner. The Subscription of Knights elected after 30th April in each year shall be payable pro rata, with a minimum payment of One Guinea.
 7. Each Knight shall furnish his address, or that of his Banker or Agent for the time being, to the Knight Remembrancer, and all notices sent or posted to that address shall be considered as duly delivered.
 8. In exceptional circumstances, the Knight President may deem it expedient to suspend the Standing Orders for the purpose of the election to the Honorary List of an exalted guest. who may be present at a meeting of The Knights, but, before doing so, he must request the concurrence of the Knights assembled. Honorary Knights take no part in the active conduct of the Club. 
 9. The Annual General Meeting of the Knights shall be held during each calendar year.
 10. The Knight President is the representative of Arthur, King of Britain, at his Knightly Board. Except in the case of a distinguished person from the Dominions or the Colonies the occupant of King Arthur's Seat should not be of lesser rank than a Knight who has received the Royal Accolade.
 11. At such Dinners to which Knights can bring a friend, that friend shall be the guest of the Knight introducing him, his dinner and wine bill being paid by such Knight.
 12. This Club is restricted to members of the male sex. On one occasion during the year, at the discretion of the Knight President and the Executive Committee, a dinner may be arranged at which it would be permissible for the Knights to invite ladies as their guests.
 13. The Ritual of the Knights as laid down in the Manual, shall be strictly observed on all occasions, and to this end the dutiful co-operation of every Knight is necessary, as promised by them in their Declaration of Fealty.
 14. The holders of the posts of Bedel and Sutler to the Knights shall receive a fee for every attendance given by them, which fee shall be regulated by the Executive Committee. The Bedel will act as Toastmaster at all Banquets, in addition to his other duties, and the Sutler will be responsible for the smooth working of the Refectory arrangements. The post of Bedel will be filled only by a person who has performed good service in a Branch of the Forces of the Crown.
 15. No new Statute or any alteration of existing Statute shall be made, except at the Annual General Meeting or a special meeting convened for the purpose.
 16. On the representation in writing to the Executive Committee by two Knights, of any Knight having been guilty of conduct unbecoming a gentleman, it shall he in the power of the Executive Committee to summon such Knight before them for the purpose of affording him an opportunity of answering the complaint. Should his explanation in the opinion of the Executive Committee be unsatisfactory, they shall have power to remove his name from the Roll of The Knights of the Round Table, and his membership will cease accordingly, the proportion of his subscription for the current year being returned to him.
 17. The decision of the Executive Committee as to the construction of the Rules and Statutes, and in all matters not provided for definitely, shall be final and conclusive.

Knight President
The current Knight President of the Society is Admiral Alan West, Baron West of Spithead. The society's chapel is the church of St Martin, Ludgate in the City of London.

Former Vice-president 
Robert Baden-Powell, 1st Baron Baden-Powell was a vice-president of the society.

External links
Alan West, Baron West of Spithead

Dining clubs